PNC Field is a 10,000-seat minor league baseball stadium that is located in Moosic, Pennsylvania in the Scranton/Wilkes-Barre metropolitan area that was built in 1989 and rebuilt in 2013. The stadium is home to the Scranton/Wilkes-Barre RailRiders, the Triple-A affiliate of the New York Yankees.

The stadium also hosts high school sports games. It hosts the PIAA District II baseball district championship games for high school baseball. It also hosts high school football games such as the Railriders Bowl for Scranton/Wilkes-Barre area high school football teams, sponsored by the Railriders. 

PNC Field was formerly known as Lackawanna County Stadium from 1989 to 2006; Lackawanna County sold the naming rights to PNC Bank on February 1, 2007, and the stadium became known as PNC Field.

History

Original structure
The stadium opened on April 26, 1989 and was built as a "mini version" of the Phillies' Veterans Stadium in Philadelphia. The artificial turf surfaced stadium was used as a multipurpose facility. The upper-level seats of the stadium were orange and the lower-level seats were green. They also have bleacher seats at the stadium. Many amateur sports competitions were held there, as well as regional band competitions, ice skating, and car shows.

On July 12, 1995, the stadium hosted the Triple-A All-Star Game. The American League affiliate stars shutout their National League opponents, 9–0, in front of 10,965 fans. Future major leaguers to appear in the game included Derek Jeter, Jeromy Burnitz, Jason Isringhausen, and manager Grady Little.

In 2007, the Scranton/Wilkes-Barre franchise signed a Player Development Contract with the New York Yankees, ending an 18-year agreement with the Philadelphia Phillies. This new contract called for the conversion of the playing surface to natural grass. The stadium still plays host to several amateur baseball competitions throughout the season.

In February, 2010, the SWB Yankees announced that they have reached an agreement with PNC Bank to renew the naming rights to the stadium. Terms of the deal were not released. 
PNC Field hosted the 2017 Triple-A Baseball National Championship Game at the end of the season, where the winner of the Pacific Coast League faced the winner of the International League.

Renovations/reconstruction and new structure
At a public hearing on November 8, 2010, officials from Lackawanna County, Mandalay Baseball Properties and the Lackawanna County Multipurpose Stadium Authority discussed the potential sale of the SWB Yankees and possible renovation of PNC Field. The following day, the club announced plans to pursue a $40 million renovation to the stadium which would dramatically alter the layout of PNC Field.

The $43.3 million renovation project would actually be a reconstruction of the stadium as it consisted of altering the layout of the stadium, thus it would receive a new structure. The reconstruction consisted of demolishing the upper deck, press box, and concourse while retaining the seating bowl and ticket office; the stadium would then get a new structure by receiving a new concourse, new press box, and luxury seating. The new structure would also make the stadium an all walk around ballpark.

The renovation officially began on April 27, 2012 beginning with the removal of seats in the stadium's upper deck. The architect of the renovation was EwingCole while the general contractor was Alvin H. Butz, Inc.

The renovation/reconstruction of PNC Field was completed in time for opening day in 2013.

It was the Yankees' alternate training site in 2020 when the COVID-19 pandemic forced the cancellation of the Minor League Baseball campaign and the abbreviation of the Major League Baseball season.

Gallery

References

External links

 SWBRailRiders.com - PNC Field
 BallParkWatch - Lackawanna County Stadium - SWB Red Barons
 PNC Field Views - Ball Parks of the Minor Leagues
 Photographs of PNC Field - Rochester Area Ballparks

Sports venues in Pennsylvania
Baseball venues in Pennsylvania
Sports venues completed in 1989
Buildings and structures in Lackawanna County, Pennsylvania
Tourist attractions in Lackawanna County, Pennsylvania
International League ballparks
1989 establishments in Pennsylvania